Jonty is a given name.  It may refer to:

Jonty Bush, Australian politician
Jonty Driver, South African activist
Jonty Harrison, British musician
Jonty Hurwitz, British artist
Jonty Jenner, Jersey cricketer
Jonty Parkin, British rugby league player
Jonty Rhodes, South African cricketer
Jonty Usborne, British broadcast engineer